Khatarnaak is a 1990 Indian Hindi-language film directed by Bharat Rangachary. The film stars Sanjay Dutt, Farah, Anita Raj in lead roles.

Cast
Sanjay Dutt as Suraj
Farah as Dr. Sangeeta Joshi
Anita Raj as Helena
Anupam Kher as Dabariya
Kiran Kumar as Jaunpuriya
Govinda as Dancer / Singer

Music
"Jeena Hai Hamka" - Amit Kumar, Govinda
"Aasman Pe Bahiti Chandni" - Abhijeet
"Mandir Mein Na Masjid Mein" - Sadhana Sargam
"Chori Chori Aaya Tu" - Alisha Chinai
"Zindagi Ne Pukara" - Asha Bhosle

References

External links

1990 films
Films scored by Anu Malik
1990s Hindi-language films
Films directed by Bharat Rangachary